This is a list of asexual characters in fiction, i.e. fictional characters that either self-identify as asexual or have been identified by outside parties to be asexual. Listed characters may also be aromantic. Not listed are celibate but not asexual characters or non-human characters, such as non-sexual computers or aliens in science-fiction, nor are asexual characters in radio or podcast series. The names are organized by the year of the character's debut.

Animation and anime

Film

Literature

Live-action television

Video games

Comics, webcomics and graphic novels

See also 

 Timeline of asexual history
 List of fictional polyamorous characters
 List of animated series with LGBTQ characters
 List of comedy television series with LGBT characters
 List of dramatic television series with LGBT characters: 1970s–2000s
 List of dramatic television series with LGBT characters: 2010s

Notes

References 

asexual